Hasel Qubi-ye Afshar (also Romanized as Ḩāşel Qūbī-ye Afshār; also known as Ḩāşel Qū’ī and Ḩāşel Qū'ī-ye Afshār) is a village in Marhemetabad Rural District, in the Central District of Miandoab County, West Azerbaijan Province, Iran. At the 2006 census, its population was 1,281, in 305 families.

References 

Populated places in Miandoab County